Monactis is a genus of sea anemones in the family Hormathiidae. There is only a single species known in this genus, Monactis vestita; it is found in the north-eastern Atlantic Ocean.

References

Hormathiidae